Dasyuromorphia is an order of mammals comprising most of the Australian carnivorous marsupials. Members of this order are called dasyuromorphs, and include quolls, dunnarts, the numbat, the Tasmanian devil, and the thylacine. They are found in Australia and New Guinea, generally in forests, shrublands, and grasslands, but also inland wetlands, deserts, and rocky areas. They range in size from the southern ningaui, at  plus a  tail, to the Tasmanian devil, at  plus a  tail, though the thylacine was much larger at up to  plus a  tail. Dasyuromorphs primarily eat invertebrates, particularly insects and arthropods, though most will also eat small lizards or other vertebrates. As the two largest species in the order, Tasmanian devils instead eat carrion of larger mammals in addition to insects, and the thylacine ate larger mammals and livestock. Most dasyuromorphs do not have population estimates, but the ones that do range from 700 to 100,000. The eastern quoll, northern quoll, dibbler, Tasmanian devil, and numbat are categorized as endangered species, while the thylacine was made extinct in 1936.

The seventy-two extant species of Dasyuromorphia are divided into two families: Dasyuridae, containing seventy-one species divided between the thirteen genera in the subfamily Dasyurinae and the four genera of the subfamily Sminthopsinae; and Myrmecobiidae, containing the numbat. There is additionally the family Thylacinidae, containing the extinct thylacine. Dozens of extinct Dasyuromorphia species have been discovered, though due to ongoing research and discoveries the exact number and categorization is not fixed.

Conventions

Conservation status codes listed follow the International Union for Conservation of Nature (IUCN) Red List of Threatened Species. Range maps are provided wherever possible; if a range map is not available, a description of the dasyuromorph's range is provided. Ranges are based on the IUCN Red List for that species unless otherwise noted. All extinct species or subspecies listed alongside extant species went extinct after 1500 CE, and are indicated by a dagger symbol "".

Classification
The order Dasyuromorphia consists of two extant families, Dasyuridae and Myrmecobiidae. Dasyuridae is divided into two subfamilies: Dasyurinae, containing forty-three species in thirteen genera, and Sminthopsinae, containing twenty-seven species in four genera. Myrmecobiidae consists of a single species. Additionally, Dasyuromorphia contains the family Thylacinidae, whose only living member, the thylacine, was made extinct in 1936. Many of these species are further subdivided into subspecies. This does not include hybrid species or extinct prehistoric species.

Family Dasyuridae
 Subfamily Dasyurinae
 Genus Antechinus (antechinuses): ten species
 Genus Dasycercus (mulgaras): two species
 Genus Dasykaluta (little red kaluta): one species
 Genus Dasyuroides (kowari): one species
 Genus Dasyurus (quolls): six species
 Genus Murexia (dasyures): five species
 Genus Myoictis (three-striped dasyures): four species
 Genus Neophascogale (speckled dasyures): one species
 Genus Parantechinus (dibbler): one species
 Genus Phascogale (phascogales): three species
 Genus Phascolosorex (marsupial shrews): two species
 Genus Pseudantechinus (false antechinus): six species
 Genus Sarcophilus (Tasmanian devil): one species

 Subfamily Sminthopsinae
 Genus Antechinomys (kultarr): one species
 Genus Ningaui (ningaui): three species
 Genus Planigale (planigale): five species
 Genus Sminthopsis (dunnart): eighteen species

Family Myrmecobiidae
 Genus Myrmecobius (numbat): one species

Family Thylacinidae
 Genus Thylacinus (thylacine): one species (one extinct)

Dasyuromorphs
The following classification is based on the taxonomy described by the reference work Mammal Species of the World (2005), with augmentation by generally accepted proposals made since using molecular phylogenetic analysis, as supported by both the IUCN and the American Society of Mammalogists.

Dasyuridae

Subfamily Dasyurinae

Subfamily Sminthopsinae

Myrmecobiidae

Thylacinidae

References

Sources

 
 
 
 

 
Dasyuromorphs
Dasyuromorphs